The 2018 ACC Emerging Teams Asia Cup was the third edition of the ACC Emerging Teams Asia Cup held in Karachi, Pakistan and Colombo, Sri Lanka. Eight teams participated in the tournament including five under-23 age level teams of Test nations and top three teams from 2018 Asia Cup Qualifier. This tournament was organized by the Asian Cricket Council (ACC). Initially, Pakistan was sole host for the tournament but India and BCCI refused to send Indian players to Pakistan. Following the increasing political tensions between India and Pakistan, ACC announced that Sri Lanka would be the co-host whilst India's matches and knockout stage will be played there. The U-23 teams from India, Bangladesh, Sri Lanka and Pakistan qualified for the semi-finals. Sri Lanka's U-23 defeated India U-23 by 3 runs in the final to win the tournament.

Teams

Squads

Group stage

Group A

Group B

Knockouts

Semi finals

Final

References

External links
Series home at ESPNcricinfo

2018 in Pakistani cricket
2018 in Sindh
2018 in Sri Lankan cricket
2010s in Colombo
2010s in Karachi
2018
December 2018 sports events in Pakistan